M P Achuthan (b. 8 Jan 1949 Vaikkalassery, Kozhikode district ) is an Indian politician who, from 2009 to 2015, represented Kerala in the Rajya Sabha as a member of the Communist party of India.

References

1949 births
Living people
Rajya Sabha members from Kerala
People from Kozhikode district
Communist Party of India politicians from Kerala